Foothill Productions is an American film company that funds and produces independent films and documentaries. It was founded in 2018 by Jamie Wolf and produced films such as The Truffle Hunters, What Would Sophia Loren Do?, and the Oscar-nominated Walk Run Cha-Cha.

Filmography

Accolades
Walk Run Cha Cha was nominated for Best Documentary Short Subject at the 92nd Academy Awards.

References

External links

Television production companies of the United States
Film production companies of the United States
American companies established in 2018